Barbara L. Nichols (born 1939) is an American nurse leader and was the first black president of the American Nurses Association. A graduate of Case Western Reserve University and the University of Wisconsin–Madison, Nichols is a former CEO of CGFNS International, a past president of the Wisconsin Nurses Association and a Living Legend of the American Academy of Nursing.

Early life
Nichols grew up in Maine and attended the Massachusetts Memorial School of Nursing and earned a bachelor's degree in nursing from Case Western Reserve University. She worked at Boston Children's Hospital before joining the United States Navy. Nichols said that in her early days as a nurse, she felt that her opinions were sometimes ignored because of her race, and she said that these experiences pushed her to become a nurse leader.

Career
At the U.S. Naval Hospital in St. Albans, Queens, Nichols was a head nurse. After leaving the Navy Nurse Corps, Nichols moved to Wisconsin, where she worked as a nurse at St. Mary's Hospital in Madison. In 1970, Nichols became president of the Wisconsin Nurses Association. As of 2013, she was still the only black president in the organization's history.

Nichols earned a master's degree at the University of Wisconsin–Madison. She became the first black president of the American Nurses Association (ANA) in 1979. While she served as ANA president, Nichols continued working at St. Mary's Hospital, serving as the hospital's director of inservice education, planning and implementing educational opportunities for hospital staff members. After her service as ANA president, Nichols was named secretary of the Wisconsin Department of Regulation and Licensing; with that appointment she became the first black female in Wisconsin to hold a state Cabinet-level role.

From the late 1990s until her retirement in 2011, Nichols was the CEO of CGFNS International, an organization that evaluates educational credentials of graduates of foreign nursing schools. Nichols saw a two-fold purpose for CGFNS: to protect the public by ensuring the adequate preparation of nurses and the protection of immigrant nurses from exploitation. Nichols has held faculty appointments at the University of Wisconsin–Madison and Excelsior College, and she has served on the board of directors of the American National Standards Institute.

Honors and awards
In 2010, Nichols was named a Living Legend of the American Academy of Nursing. She was inducted into the Institute of Excellence of the National Black Nurses Association. She is a past recipient of the Mary Mahoney Award from the ANA. She received an honorary Doctor of Science from the University of Wisconsin–Milwaukee in 1979.

Personal life
Larry Nichols, Barbara's husband, is a retired employee of the Madison Metropolitan School District. In 2015, one of her children, Nichelle, became the district's engagement chief.

References

1939 births
Living people
People from Waterville, Maine
American nursing administrators
University of Wisconsin–Madison alumni
Case Western Reserve University alumni
American women chief executives
21st-century American women